The Korean language uses special measure or counting words for specific objects and events. These suffixes are called subullyusa in Korean. They are similar to the ones employed in the Chinese and the Japanese languages.

In English it is "two sheets of paper", not "two papers". Analogously, in Korean jang is used to count sheets or anything that is a paper-like material, for example "ten bus tickets" is beoseu pyo yeol jang (버스 표 열 장 / ), literally, "bus ticket ten 'sheets'". In fact, the meanings of counter words are frequently extended in metaphorical or other image-based ways. For instance, in addition to counting simply sheets of paper, jang in Korean can be used to refer to any number of thin, paper-like objects. Leaves (namunnip 나뭇잎) are counted using this count word. In this way, a particular count word may be used generally in a very open-ended manner and up to the construal or creativity of the speaker.

There are two systems of numerals in Korean: native Korean and Sino-Korean. Native Korean numerals are used with most counter words, and usually count the number of an object, while Sino-Korean numerals are generally used for indicating a specific object in series, such as a specific lesson in a book, as well as monetary units and scientific measurements. Sometimes both types of numerals may be used, usually native Korean numerals indicating a quantity and Sino-Korean numerals indicating an ordinal. For example, yeol gwa (열 과 / ) would mean 'ten lessons' while sip gwa (십과/) would mean 'lesson ten.'

List of count words

Some count words take native Korean numerals:

Some count words take Sino-Korean numerals:

Some nouns can also function as counter words:

Some words are used for counting in multiples:

See also
 Measure word
 Classifier (linguistics)
 수분류사

Notes

References

Korean language

ko:수분류사